Ana Paula Inês Luís Ndala Fernando is an Angolan politician for the MPLA and a member of the National Assembly of Angola.

References

Living people
Members of the National Assembly (Angola)
MPLA politicians
Year of birth missing (living people)
21st-century Angolan women politicians
21st-century Angolan politicians